Novocrania is a genus of brachiopods found off shore.

Species taxonomy was reviewed by Jeffrey H. Robinson.

References

Brachiopod genera
Craniata